Amphisbaena filiformis is a species of worm lizards found in Brazil.

References

filiformis
Reptiles described in 2016
Taxa named by Síria Ribeiro
Taxa named by Jerriane O. Gomes
Taxa named by Helder Lucio Rodrigues Da Silva
Taxa named by Carlos Eduardo D. Cintra
Taxa named by Nelson Jorge Da Silva Jr.
Endemic fauna of Brazil
Reptiles of Brazil